Timber Mountain may refer to:

 Timber Mountain (San Bernardino County, California), a mountain in San Bernardino County in California
 Timber Mountain Log Ride, a log flume ride at Knott's Berry Farm in Southern California

See also
 Timber Peak, Victoria Land, Antarctica